Francis J. "Frank" Blee (born May 29, 1958) is an American Republican Party politician, who served in the New Jersey General Assembly from 1995 to 2008, where he represented the 2nd legislative district. Blee was appointed in 1995 to fill the unexpired term of the John F. Gaffney, who had died in office.

Blee was the Republican Whip in the Assembly from 2002 to 2008. He served in the Assembly on the Budget Committee, the Tourism Committee and on the Legislative Services Commission.

Blee sponsored legislation which established the nation's first statewide screening and education program for the Hepatitis C virus. This bill was signed into law by Governor of New Jersey Christine Whitman in 1998. Blee also sponsored legislation establishing a 15-member Drug Utilization Review Board which has review authority with respect to the Medicaid program, New Jersey's Pharmaceutical Assistance to the Aged and Disabled (PAAD) program, the AIDS drug distribution program and any other State and federally funded pharmaceutical benefits program. The board reviews and evaluates these pharmaceutical benefit programs to make certain they are operating efficiently. Assemblyman Blee sponsored the "Senior Gold Prescription Drug Discount Act" which significantly increases the income eligibility level for Seniors to qualify for prescription drug coverage, allowing over 100,000 previously ineligible seniors to participate in this program.

Blee served on the Absecon City Council from 1991–1995, serving as Absecon's youngest ever Council President from 1992-1993.

Blee graduated with a B.A. from Dickinson College in Political Science and received a D.C. from Life Chiropractic College (now known as Life University). He is a resident of Absecon.

Currently, Blee is an adjunct professor at Stockton University, teaching a course in Public Policy.

References

External links
Assemblyman Blee's Legislative Website
Assemblyman Blee's Campaign Website
Assembly Member Francis J. 'Frank' Blee profile, Project Vote Smart
New Jersey Voter Information Website 2003
New Jersey Legislature financial disclosure form for 2006 (PDF)
New Jersey Legislature financial disclosure form for 2005 (PDF)
New Jersey Legislature financial disclosure form for 2004 (PDF)

1958 births
Living people
Dickinson College alumni
Stockton University faculty
New Jersey city council members
Republican Party members of the New Jersey General Assembly
People from Absecon, New Jersey
Politicians from Atlantic County, New Jersey
21st-century American politicians